The I.O.O.F. Valley Junction Lodge Hall No. 604 is a historic building located in West Des Moines, Iowa, United States. C.S. Yeaton had the two-story brick commercial building constructed from 1897 to 1898. Des Moines architect C.C. Cross was responsible for the design of the Italianate structure. The International Order of Odd Fellows took possession of the building in 1907. A single-story addition was added behind 218 Fifth Street sometime before 1920, and the current storefronts were in place before 1968. The commercial space on the main floor housed a grocer, various hardware stores, and a dry cleaners over the years. The fraternal organization occupied the second floor. The tripartite main facade features two mirror halves. The floor levels in the two storefronts are raised, which is an unusual feature in the surrounding commercial district. The building was individually listed on the National Register of Historic Places in November 2017. The month before it had been included as a contributing property in the Valley Junction Commercial Historic District.

References

Commercial buildings completed in 1898
West Des Moines, Iowa
Buildings and structures in Polk County, Iowa
Odd Fellows buildings in Iowa
Italianate architecture in Iowa
National Register of Historic Places in Polk County, Iowa
Commercial buildings on the National Register of Historic Places in Iowa
Clubhouses on the National Register of Historic Places in Iowa
Individually listed contributing properties to historic districts on the National Register in Iowa